Sita Ramam is a 2022 Indian Telugu-language soundtrack album to the film of the same name composed by Vishal Chandrashekhar. The film's musical score is composed by Vishal Chandrashekhar in his third collaboration with Raghavapudi after Krishna Gaadi Veera Prema Gaadha (2016) and Padi Padi Leche Manasu (2018).

Sita Ramam featured nine songs in the film, which had lyrics written by Ananta Sriram, Sirivennela Seetharama Sastry and Krishna Kanth. For the dubbed versions, Madhan Karky (Tamil), Arun Alat and Vinayak Sasikumar (Malayalam), Kumaar, Jai Atre, Mandar Cholkar, Varun Grover, Vaibhav Joshi, Neha Shitole and Vishal Chandrashekhar (Hindi), were the lyricists. The soundtrack album only had four songs which are released as singles.

The tracks "Oh Sita Hey Rama", "Inthandham", "Kaanunna Kalyanam" were released on 9 May 2022, 1 July 2022 and 15 July 2022 respectively. Along with the fourth single "Oh Prema", the soundtrack album was also released by Sony Music on 3 August 2022 in Telugu, Tamil and Malayalam languages. Later, the tracks "Eppudo Ninnu" and "Tharali Tharali" were unveiled after the film's theatrical release, on 12 August 2022 and 19 August 2022. As of September, only 6 songs from the film were released into the album. For promoting the Hindi-dubbed version, its soundtrack was released on 1 September 2022, featuring all the nine songs and the film's theme music.

The soundtrack and score consisted of "organically rich" tunes which Chandrashekhar had attempted for the film, and has influences of Indian music from the 1960s to 1980s, interpreting traditional classical and orchestral music. The music received positive response, with praise on Chandrashekhar's composition.

Background 
For the music of Sita Ramam, Raghavapudi met his regular collaborator Chandrashekhar and narrated the script, which the latter called it as "fantastic story that has good situations which require songs", and added that "If the music has to be good, the story needs to demand music. One such film is Sita Ramam. The plot made me give exceptional music." Chandrashekhar opined that for a situation, he would conceive nearly three to four tunes, and as the film keeps developing, the preference of that particular tune might change. As he wanted to produce "organically rich music" for the film, he extensively researched on Indian music originated from the 1960s to 1980s. He was also devoid on using synthetic sounds for the film, to authenticate the musical setting.

Since Sita Ramam was initially planned to be simultaneously shot in Telugu and Tamil, the musical team had to work on composing the songs in both languages, and made several changes to ensure the uniqueness of the album. For the track "Inthandham", the tune of the original Telugu version was different from that of the dubbed Tamil version. The Tamil version of the song did not have the choral part in the initial recording. As Chandrashekhar was impressed with the choral tunes, he immediately recorded those portions for the Tamil. Each tracks had different tunes for multiple versions of the album. About the lyric writing process, he explained "Words are pronounced differently in different languages. I have a basic sense of how words are pronounced and how to make them sound the best in a song." Most of the songs in the film were based on Hindol raga, as according to Chandrashekhar, "songs not using that ragam used to become hits at that time."

The track "Kaanunna Kalyanam", the  lyrics pattern has been followed in Malayalam and Hindi version songs. But in Tamil version song "Kannukkulle" the lyrics pattern was different. As there was a change over of male and female lyric part compare to Telugu version. To match the lip sync, the song was reshot in Tamil version alone.

Chandrashekhar hired nearly 140 musicians from different countries, who were instructed to play instruments specific to that country, which he stated as: "If we are using a specific German electronic instrument, it was played by a German musician and not an Indian. It's because only a native practitioner can play it authentically." Chandrashekhar's wife and playback singer, Sinduri Vishal had recorded three songs for the film in multiple languages, had also coordinated the music, with the entire team of musicians.

Release 
Vishal Chandrashekhar stated that the film had nearly nine songs, while the album only had four songs. The first track "Oh Sita Hey Rama" was released as a single on 9 May 2022. It was also released in Tamil as "Hey Sita Hey Rama" and in Malayalam as "Pen Poove Thenvande". S. P. Charan, who sang the male portions of the song in Telugu and Tamil, called the song as "timeless" and "beautiful", appreciating Chandrashekhar's composition, lyrics, music, programming. The second single track "Inthandham" was released on 1 July, and also released as "Kurumugil" in Tamil and "Aaromal" in Malayalam, respectively. The third single, "Kaanunna Kalyanam" was released on 15 July, alongside the Tamil and Malayalam versions, titled "Kannukkule" and "Kannil Kannil", respectively. The fourth song "Oh Prema" (in Telugu), "Piriyadhey" (in Tamil) and "Thirike Vaa" (in Malayalam), were released alongside the album on 3 August.

Post the film's release, the song "Eppudo Ninnu" was released as a bonus single through YouTube on 12 August. The video song "Tharali Tharali" was released on 19 August. The soundtrack of the Hindi version, released on 1 September 2022, featuring all the nine songs from the album, including the film's theme music.

Track listing

Telugu

Tamil

Malayalam

Hindi

Reception 
Vishal Chandrashekhar's music for Sita Ramam, received positive response from critics, who called it as an "integral part of the storyline". The songs and the visual picturization also received praise. Behindwoods wrote "Vishal Chandrasekhar has indeed elevated the film with his timely musical cues." Indiaglitz wrote "The composition has been deliberately made to let the listener rejoice in the Ilaiyaraaja-era nostalgia." Pinkvilla's review for the song "Oh Sita Hey Rama" stated "Bringing back memories of a vintage Ilayaraja SP Balasubrahmanyam's musical, this is a soothing melody that is a perfect song for lovers and will make you play the song on loop."

Outlook wrote "Vishal Chandrashekar's music, be it for the background score or for the songs, work big time. The songs in this film have considerable retention value and that credit must go entirely to Vishal. His background score is also apt." Firstpost-based critic Priyanka Sundar, called the music as "sweet and charming, just like the film which stops short of being a classic." Haricharan Pudipeddi of Hindustan Times wrote "The musical score by Vishal Chandrasekhar is the soul of the film and if not for the great tracks, this would’ve been a lifeless tale of love". After the film's release, Dulquer Salmaan praised Chandrashekhar for the compositions, calling him as the "heartbeat of Sita Ramam".

References 

2022 soundtrack albums
2020s film soundtrack albums
Telugu film soundtracks
Sony Music India soundtracks
Romance film soundtracks
Drama film soundtracks